Parthenopolis was a settlement of Sithonia, Chalcidice, in ancient Macedonia.

References

Populated places in ancient Macedonia
Former populated places in Greece
Geography of ancient Chalcidice